Koss, KOSS, or in German Koß can refer to:

Places
 Koss, Michigan, US
 Koss River, South Sudan

People with the surname
Christian Koss (born 1998), American baseball player
Gaby Koss (born 1978), German soprano
Helen L. Koss (1922–2008), American politician
Ilse Reichel-Koß (1925-1993), German politician
Jan von Koss (born 1945), Norwegian fencer
Johann Olav Koss, Norwegian skater
John Koss (1895–1925), a Norwegian boxer
Koss,  Japanese nusician Kuniyuki Takahashi
Leopold Koss (1920–2012), American physician
Mary P. Koss, American professor in gender-based violence
Mathieu Koss (born 1990), French DJ, record producer and composer
Matthew Koss (born 1961), American  physicist
Milly Koss (Adele Mildred Koss; died 2012), full name Adele Mildred Koss, Us pioneer programmer
Stephen Koss (1940–1984), American historian

Other uses
 Koss (album), by Paul Kossoff
 Koss City, 2002 album by  Lord Kossity
 Koss (Star Trek), a character in Star Trek: Enterprise
 Koss Corporation, a US headphone company
 KOSS, a radio station, Lancaster, California, US

See also
Peter Coss, historian